Duau is a dialectically diverse Austronesian language spoken in the D'Entrecasteaux Islands of Papua New Guinea. It is spoken in Duau Rural LLG.

References 

Nuclear Papuan Tip languages
Languages of Milne Bay Province
D'Entrecasteaux Islands